Danylo Skoropadskyj (13 February 1904, Saint Petersburg, Russia – 23 February 1957, London, United Kingdom) was a Ukrainian politician, leader of the Ukrainian monarchist movement and Crown Prince of Ukraine from 1918 to 1919. He was the eldest surviving son of Hetman Pavlo Skoropadskyj.

During the Hetmanate he studied at the First Gymnasium in Kyiv in 1918. In 1919, Skoropadskyj, along with other members of the  House of Skoropadskyj, was forced to flee from Ukraine due to the collapse of his father's regime immediately prior to the Soviet-Polish War. He subsequently lived and studied in Switzerland, and then in Germany, where his father had been granted political asylum in Munich. He moved to London in 1939.

From 1932, he assisted his father Pavlo Skoropadskyj in leading the Ukrainian monarchist movement. In 1948 after the death of the Hetman, Skoropadskyj became the leader of Ukrainian monarchism as pretender to the throne.

Skoropadskyj was engaged on 13 February 1957 to Halyna Melnyk-Kaluzhynska, however, he died a week and a half after being poisoned by agents of the KGB in an operation to eliminate Ukrainian independence leaders. He is alleged to have had a child out of wedlock with Olesya Tukhai-Bei, although this has never been proven.

Fiancée 
Halyna Kaluzhynska was born in Volhynia near Trostyanka in 1914. After World War I she lived in Warsaw. She later married changed her surname name to Melnyk-Kaluzhynska. After World War II, Kaluzhynska relocated to the United Kingdom along with many other displaced persons. She met Skoropadsky through a mutual friend.

Skoropadskyi in literature 
 Lytovchenko, Timur and  Olena. Prince of Ukraine (historical detective) — Kharkiv: Folio. 2017. — 320 p.

References 

 Тамара Ралдугіна Штрихи до портрета спадкоємця останнього гетьмана України Данила Скоропадського (1904–1957 рр.) (Tamara Ralduhina. The portrait of heir of the last Hetman of Ukraine Danylo Skoropadskyi) – Ukrainian historic journal. 2004. No. 6 ISSN 0130-5247

1904 births
1957 deaths
20th-century Ukrainian people
Ukrainian politicians before 1991
Ukrainian nobility
Politicians from Kyiv
Ukrainian monarchists
Ukrainian expatriates in England
Ukrainian people murdered abroad
Assassinated Ukrainian politicians
Ukrainian emigrants to the United Kingdom
People killed in KGB operations